Potassium sodium tartrate tetrahydrate, also known as Rochelle salt, is a double salt of tartaric acid first prepared (in about 1675) by an apothecary, Pierre Seignette, of La Rochelle, France. Potassium sodium tartrate and monopotassium phosphate were the first materials discovered to exhibit piezoelectricity. This property led to its extensive use in "crystal" gramophone (phono) pick-ups, microphones and earpieces during the post-World War II consumer electronics boom of the mid-20th century. Such transducers had an exceptionally high output with typical pick-up cartridge outputs as much as 2 volts or more. Rochelle salt is deliquescent so any transducers based on the material deteriorated if stored in damp conditions.

It has been used medicinally as a laxative. It has also been used in the process of silvering mirrors. It is an ingredient of Fehling's solution (reagent for reducing sugars). It is used in electroplating, in electronics and piezoelectricity, and as a combustion accelerator in cigarette paper (similar to an oxidizer in pyrotechnics).

In organic synthesis, it is used in aqueous workups to break up emulsions, particularly for reactions in which an aluminium-based hydride reagent was used. Sodium Potassium tartrate is also important in the food industry. 

It is a common precipitant in protein crystallography and is also an ingredient in the Biuret reagent which is used to measure protein concentration. This ingredient maintains cupric ions in solution at an alkaline pH.

Preparation

The starting material is tartar with a minimum tartaric acid content 68 %. This is first dissolved in water or in the mother liquor of a previous batch. It is then basified with hot saturated sodium hydroxide solution to pH 8, decolorized with activated charcoal, and chemically purified before being filtered. The filtrate is evaporated to 42 °Bé at 100 °C, and passed to granulators in which Seignette's salt crystallizes on slow cooling. The salt is separated from the mother liquor by centrifugation, accompanied by washing of the granules, and is dried in a rotary furnace and sieved before packaging. Commercially marketed grain sizes range from 2000 μm to < 250 μm (powder).

Larger crystals of Rochelle salt have been grown under conditions of reduced gravity and convection on board Skylab .
Rochelle salt crystals will begin to dehydrate when the relative humidity drops to about 30% and will begin to dissolve at relative humidities above 84%.

Piezoelectricity

In 1824, Sir David Brewster demonstrated piezoelectric effects using Rochelle salts, which led to him naming the effect pyroelectricity.

In 1919, Alexander McLean Nicolson worked with Rochelle salt developing audio related inventions like microphones and speakers at Bell Labs.

References

Potassium compounds
Organic sodium salts
Piezoelectric materials
Ferroelectric materials
Tartrates
Food acidity regulators
Food antioxidants
Double salts
E-number additives